There are over 20,000 Grade II* listed buildings in England. This page is a list of these buildings in the district of Eastbourne in East Sussex.

Eastbourne

|}

Notes

External links

Eastbourne
Eastbourne